Loubna Abidar (born 20 September 1985) is a Moroccan actress.

Career
Abidar was born in Marrakesh. She made her film debut in Much Loved, which was directed by Nabil Ayouch.  The film was banned in Morocco due to its graphic sex scenes.

In November 2015, Abidar was violently attacked in Casablanca and left the country for France soon after. In January 2016, she received a nomination for the César Award for Best Actress for her role in the film.

Filmography

References

External links

1985 births
Living people
People from Marrakesh
Moroccan film actresses
21st-century Moroccan actresses
Moroccan feminists